Big Brother Australia 2013, also known as Big Brother 10, is the tenth season of the Australian reality television series, Big Brother. It began on 28 July 2013, with a pre-recorded launch show airing on 29 July 2013 on the Nine Network. On 6 November 2013, after 101 days of competition, Tim Dormer won the competition and the $250,000 prize. It is the second season of the show to air on the network after it picked up the series in 2012, following a four-year absence. Sonia Kruger continued to host the show, with Mike Goldman continuing as narrator.

This season ran during the 2013 Australian Federal Election. As Australia has compulsory voting for elections, the housemates (except Jade, as she was not on the electoral roll) had to vote for this election while in the house.

Nathan Little was the first housemate in the Big Brother franchise worldwide to evict himself and give his spot to another player.

Dormer later won a public vote to compete in the fourth season of Big Brother Canada. After 77 Days, he placed third. Dormer, Drew and Smyth later competed in the fourteenth season of Big Brother Australia as a part of Big Brother Royalty.

Production

Development 
The renewal of Big Brother was predicted before the finale of the previous season due to the success the reboot had in ratings. The renewal was confirmed when it was included in Nine's 2013 programming advertisements from 23 November 2012. Open auditions for the new season took place in April 2013. That year, the capital cities of Darwin and Hobart were not visited, however, Newcastle was. For the first time since moving to Nine, the show accepted video auditions provided the auditionee lived more than 500 km away from the closest audition venue. In mid-July, an announcement on the official Facebook page confirmed that the tenth season of Big Brother Australia would feature more housemates to enter the house than in previous seasons. On 21 July 2013, after the housemates had entered lockdown, it was confirmed that a weekly live games task would take place in the first four weeks of the season; it was known as the 'Saturday Showdown' and was hosted by Shelley Craft, with commentary from Mike Goldman and 2012 housemate Michael Beveridge (although the 'Saturday Showdown' was later revealed on the official website to be a pre-recorded showing of the previous night when the games took place and that no live recording would be done). This was similar to the Friday Night Live games format used in previous seasons. Later that same day, it was revealed that "the biggest twist in Big Brother history" would involve the possibility of a separation within the house, hinted at in cryptic announcements from Big Brother and in advertisements showing sneak peeks of the new season. It was suspected that the twist would somehow affect the running and outcome of the Saturday Showdown. On 25 July 2013, speculations surfaced on whether the eviction shows would be moving to Monday nights due to the returning of Australia's Got Talent. These rumours were later confirmed by Nine before the show began with a pre-recorded launch on 29 July 2013.

On 24 October 2013, it was announced that Big Brother Australia would be returning to New Zealand on TV3, after a seven-year absence following the conclusion of the 2005 series. The series aired on an almost four-month delay, a departure from when the series previously aired on TV2 and Prime less than 24 hours after airing in Australia. The premiere was on 25 November 2013.

Mid-season changes

Week 4 changes 
In response to declining ratings and viewer complaints, several changes were made during the fourth week of the season. The second eviction, originally planned to be a single eviction, became a double eviction necessitated by the cancellation of the Halfway House concept on the Wednesday.

The Saturday Showdown also moved from its Saturday timeslot a week earlier than originally planned. Showdown was intended to air on a Saturday for the first four weeks, up until 24 August 2013, before moving to Thursday due to the NRL finals airing from the following weekend. Showdown was no longer hosted by Shelley Craft, and Michael Beveridge no longer provided commentary as the games were now shown in sequence during the daily show depicting Wednesday's events – with Mike Goldman, the sole survivor of the revamp, who provided the narration as per normal.

Late Night Feast 
At the same time, it was also announced that beginning on 27 August 2013, Nine would air a new show titled Late Night Feast at 9:30PM once a week. Each episode depicted the events that took place during a party thrown by Big Brother days earlier on Friday night. Each party was themed – with the first being Las Vegas and Hawaiian the following week – and followed a loose structure. While the housemates sat at a table eating food and drink provided by Big Brother, they discussed topics aimed more towards adult viewing – including religion, sexuality and politics – and then proceeded to play party games and were then given music to dance to.

Unlike other adult-orientated shows that had previously aired on Ten – UpLate, Uncut and Adults Only – the show was not hosted, nor did Mike Goldman provide any narration – instead footage of housemates in the diary room on the Saturday, discussing the previous night's events, was shown to link the various segments together.

At the end of the eviction show on 23 September 2013, Sonia Kruger announced that the final Late Night Feast would air the following night. However the weekly event continued to take place in the house, with little to no footage making it into the daily show.

Week 10 schedule changes 
On 6 September 2013, Dreamworld emailed people who had already purchased tickets for the 30 September 2013 eviction with the information that the eviction date had been changed to 2 October 2013 as a result of "scheduling changes" and that all evictions from that date would occur on a Wednesday. Despite initial speculation that this was due to increased airtime for Australia's Got Talent, it was later confirmed that a 90-minute show would continue to air on a Monday – indicating the change was a result of Nine wanting to move eviction shows so they no longer aired against The X Factor.

The show that was originally intended to be an eviction on 30 September 2013 was used as an intruder eviction and also added two new female intruders to the house.

As a result of these changes, the entire schedule for the show was re-worked and came into effect from 1 October 2013. Nominations moved from Tuesday to Thursday and were cut down to 60 minutes. Big Brother Confidential moved from Wednesday to Thursday airing immediately after nominations and the Monday and Tuesday shows became daily shows, with Monday covering the three previous days in the house. Showdown took place on Mondays, and was incorporated into Tuesday's daily show.

Week 11 schedule changes 
Beginning in the eleventh week, the Tuesday daily show had its length reduced to 60 minutes − the Tuesday timeslot, which up until the week prior was used for nominations, had run for 90 minutes since the series began.

Confidential cancellation 
Starting in the twelfth week, Nine removed Confidential from the schedule after it followed the nominations show on a Thursday for just two weeks. As a result, Thursday's broadcast was trimmed to 60 minutes, down 30 minutes from the length it was at the beginning of the series.

Ultimately this proved to be a cancellation of the entire Confidential format, as unlike its early end the previous year, it did not return for the subsequent series.

Extension 
Originally planned to end on 23 October 2013, rumours began circulating in late September 2013 that the series had been extended by two weeks. This was fuelled by the previous year's winner, Benjamin Norris, mentioning an extension in a blog post on 17 September 2013 that covered that week's fake double eviction. It was also further fuelled by the date of the finale being removed from the terms and conditions of the KFC Say It with Chicken competition that would see two tickets to the finale being given away. On 26 September 2013, tickets appeared on the Dreamworld website to an Eviction show that would take place on the original finale date, thus confirming that the series had been extended in some capacity.

On 21 October 2013, the new date for the finale was revealed; the series would end on 6 November 2013.

The extension allowed a total of four intruders to enter the house as, for the first time in the series history, there were no plans to include them in the original plan for this series.

Housemates
Twelve housemates entered on Day 0. Two more housemates (Drew and Jade) entered on Day 1 as a fake married couple. On Day 8, Rohan and sisters Katie & Lucy (playing together as one housemate) entered the house. On Day 58, two male intruders, Justynn and Nathan, entered the house. Finally, on Day 64, Madaline and Boog entered as the female intruders.

The House
The purpose built house was located at Dreamworld on the Gold Coast Australia.
The house was divided into two areas; the Halfway House and the Safe House, from Day 0 to Day 24. From Day 24, the divides were removed and all remaining housemates moved to the Safe House. A secret bedroom was also revealed to the housemates on Day 24.

Rooms/Areas within the Safe House included:
Safe House Diary Room (renamed the Diary Room from Day 24 onwards) 
Nominations Room
Presidential Suite (Rewards Room)
Backyard
Lounge Area
Kitchen
Main Bedroom
Secret Bedroom (Day 24 onwards) 
Bathroom
Fitness Area
Spa and Pool Areas

Some of the rooms/areas of the Halfway House were still accessible after the divides were removed. These rooms/areas are highlighted in bold.

Room/Areas within the Halfway House included: 
Halfway House Diary Room
Laundry
Small Lounge
Small Yard
Small Bedroom
Outdoor Shower

There was also a large arena that was accessible via the backyard. This was where the weekly Saturday Showdown/Showdown took place.

Halfway and Safe House
On Day 0, Big Brother announced that half of the housemates will move to the Safe House or the Halfway House. The Safe House was luxuriously decorated, while the Halfway House expressed simplicity and discomfort. The two houses were separated by a single glass wall. Housemates in either house were forbidden from crossing the divide. Every Tuesday, housemates with the most nomination points that week moved to or stayed in the Halfway House.
On Day 24, the two houses made one house, with the divides between them removed.

Weekly summary

Weekly summary

Showdown

Nominations Table 
Housemates are allowed to distribute five nomination points between their two nominations, with a maximum of four points to be allocated to one housemate. The six housemates with the most nomination points face the public vote. In the event of a tie, the housemate with the most nomination points determines how the tie will be broken. In addition, nominations are held in a sound-proof chamber inside a Nominations Room, as opposed to the Diary Room.

Nominations Super Power
The Nominations Super Power is a weekly twist to nominations. It is a special secret power given to a housemate. The Nominations Super Power gives an advantage to that housemate for nominations in that given week.

 In Week 2's nominations, Matthew was able to double a housemate's nomination points without them knowing. He chose Caleb.
 In Week 3's nominations, Ed was able to listen to 3 of his fellow housemates' nominations. He chose Drew, Tim and Xavier.
 In Week 4's nominations, Tully was shown the live tally board. She also nominated with 6 nomination points to nominate up to 6 housemates.
 In Week 5's nominations, Heidi was allowed to ask Big Brother questions about nominations as long as the answer is Yes or No. She could ask up to 9 questions, and had 6 nomination points to nominate up to 3 housemates.
 In Week 6's nominations, Matthew was given the ability to void 2 of his housemates' nominations. He chose Ben and Drew.
 In Week 7's nominations, Drew was able to predict the other housemates' nominations. For every name he predicted correctly, he earned a point to nominate with. He earned 7 out of 18 points and was able to nominate as many housemates as he wanted with those points.
 In Week 8's nominations, Ed was told that Ben (who he believed to be evicted) was in Big Brother's Headquarters and would be able to answer any questions he had about the tally board. Ed also had 6 points to nominate with.
In Week 10's nominations, Jade was able to read three people's nominations, she was also able to shred one of these nominations. She chose to read Ben, Tahan and Tim's nominations, she then chose to shred Tim's nominations, making them void.
In Week 11's nominations, Mikkayla was able to take 2 nominations points from two separate housemates, she could also nominate with the stolen points from the housemates and she was in the room when they nominated. She chose Tahan and Boog.

Note:  The Housemate holding the superpower, each week it was in play, is marked in green.

Notes 

 : Drew and Jade failed their secret fake marriage and were automatically nominated for eviction, but still voted in nominations. As Katie & Lucy and Rohan were new housemates, they were exempt from nominations. Heidi and Tim were both on 10 points following nominations, and therefore the housemate with the most nomination points, Mikkayla, had to choose who she wanted in the Halfway House. She chose Tim.
 : As there was a tie on 7 points between Matthew and Mikkayla, it was down to the housemate or housemates with the most nomination points to decide which of them would face eviction. Tahan and Tully chose Mikkayla. A double eviction took place on Day 22.
 : Caleb, as punishment for discussing nominations, was only allowed to nominate with 3 points as 2 were automatically given to him. Caleb was initially told he would nominate two housemates with his remaining points, but was allowed to allocate them all to a single housemate upon his request. As it was a 5-way tie on 3 points, it was up to Tully, the housemate with the most points, to decide who would take the last place and who would therefore be nominated; she chose Mikkayla.
 : In Week 6, Big Brother asked housemates to strategically nominate. All housemates had to nominate in the Diary Room, writing their nominations on paper and putting them in a ballot box.
 : As there was a tie on 4 points between Jade and Tim, it was down to Ed, the housemate with the most nomination points, to decide which of them would face eviction. He chose Jade. This week there was a 'fake' double eviction. The person with the lowest votes to save would be evicted and the housemate with the highest votes to save would be moved to the Presidential Suite; this housemate was Ben.
 : Assuming Ben had been evicted, the housemates could not nominate him, however Ben could still secretly nominate from the Presidential Suite.
 : There were no nominations in Week 9. Instead, all housemates were all automatically nominated for the eviction on Day 66. The winner of this week's Showdown gained the ability to save themselves and one other housemate of their choice from eviction. New housemates Justynn and Nathan were not nominated for this eviction. Instead, they faced a special intruder eviction on Day 64.
 : In Week 10, all housemates had to nominate in the Diary Room. To nominate, they filled out their nominations on the back of a picture of themselves, sealing them in an envelope and then putting them into a filing cabinet where they originally retrieved their envelope from. New Intruders Madaline and Boog were supposed to face an Intruder eviction on Day 71, but as Nathan voluntary left the Big Brother House, this eviction was cancelled, and both Boog and Madaline (the intended evictee) were saved from eviction.
 : In Week 11, housemates nominated in the Diary Room. They nominated on a piece of blank paper then folded them and placed them into a small ballet box; the purpose of this was to help with this week's Nominations Super Power.
 : In Week 12, nominations took place face to face, after they had already written their nominations on paper – as they had done for the past three weeks – and explained them to Big Brother. The housemates then repeated their reasoning in front of the other Housemates.
 : In Week 13, housemates watched one of their family or friends in the chamber nominating with 2 of their 5 points, leaving the housemates with only 3 points to nominate one other housemate with. The eviction percentages were not revealed this week, due to the close proximity of the finale.
 : There were no nominations in the final week. Instead, the public were voting to win rather than to save. The lines froze on Day 99 and the two housemates with the lowest votes were evicted, leaving three housemates in the final.

Ratings

Ratings are rounded to the nearest ten thousand. Figures in bold include consolidated viewing figures.

Special Shows

Live Special 
On Day 2, Sonia Kruger hosted a special live show that saw the second part of the season's twist revealed as Drew and Jade entered the Safe House pretending to be a married couple. They were tasked with trying to fool the others with this prospect for the whole of the first week. If they were successful, they would earn immunity from the first weekly eviction; if they were found out, they would both automatically face eviction.

The Latecomers 
On Day 8, Sonia Kruger hosted a special live show that saw new housemates Rohan and Katie & Lucy enter the house and Drew and Jade's failure of their secret task revealed to the housemates.

The Male Intruders 
On Day 58, Sonia Kruger hosted a special live show that saw two intruders enter the house, Nathan and Justynn.

The Female Intruders 
On Day 64, Sonia Kruger hosted a special live show that saw two female intruders enter the Big Brother house.  The first was Boog, a 23-year-old personal trainer from Melbourne, and, the other, Madaline, a 24-year-old lawyer from Sydney.

Trick or Treat 
On Day 95, Sonia Kruger hosted a special live Halloween show that saw the remaining five housemates, Boog, Drew, Jade, Tahan and Tim to view 'trick' and 'treat' packages. The 'trick' packages contained negative parts of each housemates time including being talked about by other housemates, nominations, etc. The 'treat' packaged contained positive parts of each housemates time along with some messages from family and friends.

References

External links
Official website

2013 Australian television seasons
10